Fláajökull is a smaller, slow flowing glacier of Iceland, located on the east side of volcano Breiðabunga in the east of Iceland, in Vatnajökull National Park, 40 km on road or 20 km on the map, northwest of Höfn town.

Fláajökull is a drainglacier of the large glacier Vatnajökull. The name derives from flár, the Icelandic word for "slope". Historical names of the glacier are Mýrajökull, Hólmsárjökull and Hólsárjökull.

References

External links 
 Fláajökull Field trip and Excursion Report – Glacial geology (JAR407), University of Iceland – School of Engineering and Natural Science – Earth Science, 22 and 31 May 2012
 Oddur Sigurðsson1 and Richard S. Williams Jr.: Geographic Names of Iceland’s Glaciers: Historic and Modern U.S. Department of the Interior, retrieved 5 February 2014

Drainage basins of the Atlantic Ocean
Glaciers of Iceland